Christine Laser (born 19 March 1951) is a former German athlete who mainly competed in the pentathlon.

Biography
Christine Bodner was born in Mattstedt, near Apolda, Thüringen. She competed for East Germany at the 1976 Summer Olympics held in Montreal, Quebec,  Canada where she won the silver medal in the pentathlon between team mates Siegrun Siegl and Burglinde Pollak for an East German clean sweep.

Bodner married the hurdler Jürgen Laser in 1974.

References

External links 
 

1951 births
People from Weimarer Land
East German pentathletes
Olympic athletes of East Germany
Athletes (track and field) at the 1972 Summer Olympics
Athletes (track and field) at the 1976 Summer Olympics
Athletes (track and field) at the 1980 Summer Olympics
Olympic silver medalists for East Germany
Living people
Medalists at the 1976 Summer Olympics
Olympic silver medalists in athletics (track and field)
Sportspeople from Thuringia
People from Bezirk Erfurt